The 1842 Ohio gubernatorial election was held on October 11, 1842.

Incumbent Whig Governor Thomas Corwin was defeated by Democratic nominee and former Governor Wilson Shannon.

General election

Results

References

1842
Ohio
Gubernatorial